Swathi Muthyam is a 1986 Indian Telugu-language drama film written and directed by K. Viswanath and produced by Edida Nageswara Rao. The film stars Kamal Haasan and Raadhika, while Gollapudi Maruti Rao, J. V. Somayajulu, Nirmalamma, Sarath Babu, and Y. Vijaya play supporting roles. The soundtrack and background score were composed by Ilaiyaraaja. Swathi Muthyam depicts the plight of a young widow who is rescued by an autistic man.

Swathi Muthyam was a box office success. The film was screened at the Moscow Film Festival, the Asian and African film festival in Tashkent, the 11th IFFI in the inaugural mainstream section. The film received the National Film Award for Best Feature Film in Telugu, three Nandi Awards and the Filmfare Award for Best Director – Telugu. The film was selected by India as its entry for the Best Foreign Language Film for the Academy Awards in 1986, but was not nominated.

The film was later dubbed into Tamil as Sippikkul Muthu, released on October 2, 1986. Upon its success, Viswanath directed its Hindi version Eeshwar (1989) and in Kannada it was remade as Swathi Muthu (2003).

Plot
Sivayya (Kamal Haasan) is an innocent orphan with a brain injury resulting in low intellectual function. He lives along with his grandmother (Nirmalamma) in a village. In that village, Lalitha (Raadhika), a young widow with a five-year-old son, lives along with her brother Chalapati's (Sarath Babu) family. She and her son often get abused by her sister-in-law (Y. Vijaya), but Lalitha, having nowhere to go, bears it all.

Sivayya often encounters Lalitha and gets appalled by her condition. One day, during Sri Rama Navami festival, Sivayya marries Lalitha, shocking all the villagers. His grandmother (Nirmalamma) approves of his marriage as she also has much sympathy and regard for Lalitha, but his uncle and Orthodox villagers oppose that marriage as they consider remarriage of a widow as a sin. In that brawl, Sivayya's grandmother dies, leaving innocent Sivayya in the hands of Lalitha. Lalitha moves in with her husband with the blessings of her brother.

Some of the villagers help them to build a new life. Gradually, Lalitha makes Sivayya understand the household duties and responsibilities of a man. Sivayya finds work and starts to support his wife and stepson. Later they have a son and live happily for a long time. Years pass, and Lalitha becomes ill and dies in her husband's arms. In the climax, Sivayya walks out of his house surrounded by his children and grandchildren. He carries a tulsi plant, which was his memory of Lalitha's love.

Cast

 Kamal Haasan as Sivayya
 Raadhika as Lalitha
 Gollapudi Maruthi Rao as Landlord
 J. V. Somayajulu as Lalita's guru
 Nirmalamma as Sivayya's grandmother
 Master Karthik as Balasubrahmanyam, Lalita's first son, whom later adopted or accepted by Sivayya after their marriage
 Sarath Babu as Chalapati, Lalita's brother
 Y. Vijaya as Lalita's sister-in-law
 Allu Arjun (child artist) as Sivayya's grandson
 Major Sundarrajan as Rao
 Deepa
 Dubbing Janaki
 Mallikarjuna Rao
 Suthi Veerabhadra Rao
 Edida Sriram

Production
Arun Kumar and Venkatesh were the production designers for the film.
The film was shot for nearly 70 days near the shores of Rajahmundry, Torredu, Tadikonda, Pattiseema, Chennai, and Mysore. Allu Arjun did a small role as one of the grandsons of Kamal Haasan.

The scene where Haasan dances like someone who cannot dance took so many days to get it "rightly wrong," as Haasan is a seasoned dancer.

Soundtrack

Reception 
Baradwaj Rangan said in 2017, "K. Viswanath, this year's recipient of the Dadasaheb Phalke Award, made three films with Kamal Haasan. Sagara Sangamam is the best, Subha Sankalpam the weakest – and between these two films, chronologically and quality-wise, lies Swathi Muthyam (White Pearl)." Reviewing the Tamil dubbed version Sippikul Muthu, Jayamanmadhan of Kalki wrote Even if it seems like an aimless story that started somewhere and suddenly stopped, the reality is that we have connected with the story until it happened.

Awards

Remakes

References

External links

1986 films
1980s Telugu-language films
Films about autism
1986 romantic drama films
Indian nonlinear narrative films
Films scored by Ilaiyaraaja
Indian romantic drama films
Films directed by K. Viswanath
Fictional characters with disabilities
Telugu films remade in other languages
Films about widowhood in India
Best Telugu Feature Film National Film Award winners